Chitrangada can refer to the following people in Hindu epics:
Chitrāngadā, a wife of Arjuna
Chitrāngadā, a daughter of Vishwakarma
Chitrāngada, a son of Shantanu, king of Kuru
Chitrāngadā, father of Bhanumati

People
 Chitrangada Mori, ruler of Panwar (Puar) Rajput clan
 Chitrangada Singh, actor

Other
 Chitrangada, a dance-drama by Rabindranath Tagore, one of the Rabindra Nritya Natya
 Chitrangada: The Crowning Wish, a 2012 film by Rituparno Ghosh
 Chitrangada (film), a 2017 Telugu film